Lindsay Broughton (born in Brooklin, Ontario) is a Canadian country music singer-songwriter. Broughton is signed to Curve Music with distribution through Sony Music Canada. She has charted three singles on the Billboard Canada Country chart.

Broughton released her self-titled extended play on August 14, 2012. In 2013, she won the Country Music Association of Ontario Rising Star award. She was nominated for Female Artist of the Year in 2014. Her full-length debut album, Take Me There, was released on November 11, 2014.

Discography

Extended plays

Studio albums

Singles

Music videos

Awards and nominations

References

External links

Canadian women country singers
Living people
Musicians from Ontario
Year of birth missing (living people)
21st-century Canadian women singers